Dr. Simon Hurt, commonly known simply as Doctor Hurt, is a fictional character from the DC Comics universe. First appearing as an unnamed character in Batman #156 (June 1963), the character was retroactively revived in 2008 by writer Grant Morrison and established as Thomas Wayne, a distant relative of Bruce Wayne (the alter-ego of Batman) and his father Thomas Wayne.

Development info
Visually, Doctor Hurt is based on an unnamed scientist who first appeared in Batman #156 (June 1963), in a story titled "Robin Dies at Dawn". In that story Batman participated in an experiment for NASA that caused him to hallucinate that Robin (Dick Grayson) was in constant danger; the story itself is referenced many times in Morrison's run on Batman. The character made behind-the-scenes appearances throughout Morrison's run before actually appearing fully in the first chapter of "Batman R.I.P."

The character was first called "Doctor Simon Hurt" in Batman #674. He is a brilliant psychologist whose true identity and nature is an enigma; over the course of Morrison's run he has been strongly implied at times to be the devil, the demon Barbatos, a supernaturally-empowered ancestor of Bruce Wayne, Bruce Wayne's long-lost evil twin brother, Bruce Wayne's father, an instrument of Darkseid, and perhaps even Darkseid himself. Hurt is dedicated to completely destroying Batman in body, mind, and soul, and replacing him with a corrupted, evil counterpart.

Doctor Hurt led both the Black Glove and the Club of Villains against Batman in "Batman R.I.P." Hurt was the main antagonist of Morrison's run on Batman titles from 2007 to 2011, appearing in Batman, The Return of Bruce Wayne, and Batman and Robin, as well as behind-the-scenes in Final Crisis.

Fictional character biography
A psychiatrist, Doctor Hurt was involved in a program which created three "replacement Batmen" with the participation of the Gotham City Police Department. Sometime after the three replacements had been trained, Hurt was hired by the Defense Department to oversee an isolation experiment. During this process, he gave Batman a post-hypnotic trigger connected to the phrase "Zur-En-Arrh". He also arranged for the replacements to fight the dazed Batman, but they were defeated; Batman suspected nothing of this.

Going over his notes on Batman's psychology, he realized that Batman was "powered by tragedy" and set about traumatizing the three replacements, ostensibly to make them better crimefighters.

Many years later, Doctor Hurt was working with the Black Glove when they decided to target Batman and the Dark Knight's allies. Their first attack consisted of character assassination on the Wayne family, by spreading information to suggest that Thomas Wayne somehow survived the murder by Joe Chill (to the point of arranging for the 'attack' in order to conceal his own debauchery). Hurt then, using the Zur-En-Arrh trigger in conjunction with drugs, sent the dazed and confused Bruce Wayne onto the streets of Gotham with no memory. Furthering this attack, he claimed to Alfred Pennyworth that he was actually Thomas himself, although Alfred denied this.

However, Batman survived thanks to years of preparation, culminating in a confrontation with Hurt on Arkham Asylum's roof. He accused Hurt of being Mangrove Pierce, an actor, acquaintance, and occasional impersonator of Thomas, but Hurt claimed that he had actually "skinned Mangrove Pierce alive and wore [the man] to Mayhew's party".

Hurt was believed to be dead after a helicopter explosion, but somehow survived and reappeared approximately six months later in Mexico, disguised as the drug lord El Penitente, but left to return to Gotham City. With Joker working as an unreliable ally, Hurt used the Circus of Crime to release a drug into Gotham's air with the intention of driving the city mad, subsequently making a public return as Thomas with the intention of setting up his headquarters in the Batcave. Hurt shot Dick Grayson in the back of the head and attempted to force Damian Wayne to swear allegiance to him in order to save Grayson's life. However, Grayson and Damian had already anticipated his attack; the attempts to open the box that Bruce left in the past revealing nothing but a Batarang and a note saying "Gotcha!", the room subsequently filling with smoke as another Batman appears, marking Bruce's return to the fold. It is revealed that he is a relative of the Wayne family from the 17th century whose true identity is Thomas Wayne, a black sheep of the family because of his devil worship. Hurt prolonged his life through a series of occult rituals. In a story immediately previous, Batman states that Darkseid is attempting to "incarnate . . . in Hurt . . . in the Doctor". In the subsequent confrontation, Hurt attempts—and fails—to trap Bruce in a prison in the Batcave, but nevertheless escapes through the cave's water access while Bruce is busy rescuing Alfred. Having escaped to a graveyard, Hurt is confronted and defeated by the Joker when he slips on a banana peel and breaks his neck. The Joker doses Hurt with Joker venom and buries him alive, claiming that he proved to be a disappointment as a "new" arch-enemy. It is revealed that Dick has survived the injuries, despite Hurt's intent to eventually render him comatose and nearly brain dead. Joker claims that he has "taken care" of Hurt, but Bruce is not quite willing to believe that the Doctor is truly dead.

He appears in the Convergence limited series, where a group of Pre-Flashpoint Batman villains, including Riddler and Professor Pyg, attempt to confront the Batman of the modern, reimagined Earth-Two (who is commonly mistaken for the Flashpoint Batman due to a similar costume). These villains, seeing him as simply an obstacle, attack en masse. This version of Hurt is eventually slain when Thomas of Earth 2 blows himself up as a delaying tactic.

DC Rebirth
In 2016, DC Comics implemented another relaunch of its books called "DC Rebirth", which restored its continuity to a form much as it was prior to "The New 52". He was still considered an ancestor of Thomas Wayne in this continuity and his immortality is because of the Hyper-Adapter that is fused to him. Simon recruited Professor Pyg and made him create Dollotrons of Robin and Nightwing, one that becomes the man known as Deathwing. Deathwing brings him Robin, who he plans to kill at dawn, but the Doctor was apparently killed when Deathwing stabbed him, but not before stabbing Deathwing too.

Character overview
Hurt claims to be Dr. Thomas Wayne, the name being shared with a devil-worshiping ancestor back in the 18th century. Batman initially suspects him to be the actor Mangrove Pierce, dismissing the belief of the third replacement Batman and the Joker that Hurt is the devil; Hurt alludes to this possibility several times using metaphor only, claiming "I am the hole in things..."the enemy", "the piece that can never fit, there since the beginning", all cryptic statements that relate to the mythology of a demonic figure. Near the end of "Batman R.I.P.", however, Batman begins to wonder whether Hurt really is the devil. Batman states that Darkseid is attempting to "incarnate" in Hurt.

Following numerous hints and plot threads throughout Batman and Robin and Batman: The Return of Bruce Wayne, the mystery of Hurt's identity was seemingly resolved in Batman and Robin #16, in which he was identified as a devil-worshipping ancestor of Bruce Wayne's named Thomas Wayne (first mentioned in Batman and Robin #10 and appearing in Batman: The Return of Bruce Wayne #4). The issue reveals that, centuries beforehand, Hurt attempted to summon the demon Barbatos, but instead was confronted by the Hyper-Adapter, a hyper-dimensional creature tasked by Darkseid with overseeing Batman's voyage through history after he was struck by the villain's Omega Effect. Corrupted — or perhaps possessed — by the Hyper-Adapter's energies, this Thomas Wayne became extremely long-lived (potentially immortal), living until the present day, when he was taken in by Batman's parents, Thomas and Martha Wayne. Wishing to help him, the Waynes send him to Willowood Asylum, a reference to a Pre-Crisis story in which Bruce had a mentally damaged brother who was sent to the same facility. This was previously been referenced in Morrison's Batman #702, which showed the asylum as the same hospital to which Thomas Wayne Jr. was sent. Batman and Dick Grayson conclude this reading of events to be the truth, and impartial flashbacks in the issue appear to confirm it as accurate, though the insane Hurt continues to claim throughout the issue that he is both Thomas Wayne and the devil. However, since Hurt was already an adult man when the Waynes met him, it seems unlikely that they would have claimed him to be their son, Thomas Jr. As Bruce Wayne travels through time as a result of the Omega Effect, Hurt is seen as a doctor in Willowood, rather than a patient.
Grant Morrison explains the ambiguity during an interview in Wizard Magazine:

Other versions
Hurt appears in the "Batman in Bethlehem" alternate future where Damian Wayne became Batman In Batman Incorporated (vol. 2) #5. Damian fails to stop a "Joker Virus" from devastating Gotham City. Dr. Hurt, having become a personal advisor to the President of the United States, convinces the president to destroy Gotham with a nuclear weapon.

See also
 List of Batman family enemies

References

Characters created by Sheldon Moldoff
Characters created by Grant Morrison
Comics characters introduced in 1963
Comics characters introduced in 2008
DC Comics supervillains
Fictional actors
Fictional businesspeople
Fictional physicians
Fictional psychiatrists
Fictional people from the 17th-century